At Home with the Noonans is a six-part documentary presented, produced and directed by Donal MacIntyre. It shows the lives of members of a criminal gang run by  Domenyk Noonan in Manchester, England. The first episode was broadcast on 22 April 2012 on Crime & Investigation Network in the UK.

UK broadcast dates

References

2012 British television series debuts
2012 British television series endings
2010s British documentary television series
English-language television shows